Gregory Piper (born 15 March 1998) is a British actor best known for playing Ryan Pilkington in Line of Duty.

Line of Duty 
He was 13 years old when he first appeared in Line of Duty series 1 playing young criminal Ryan Pilkington.

Following complaints from some viewers, Ofcom found that the BBC had made a "serious lapse" in its duty of care for Piper by "failing to ensure that a child welfare counsellor or psychologist had considered the appropriateness or potential emotional risk to the boy of his involvement", given the violent nature of some of his scenes.

Piper reprised the role as a more prominent antagonist in series 5, in which he was shown as a Central Police cadet. In series 6, Pilkington appears more extensively as an officer in the murder investigation team secretly working as a mole for the organised crime syndicate.

Filmography

Awards and nominations

References

External links

1998 births
Living people
English male television actors
People from Dudley